This is a list of states and territories of India by number of people for whom Tamil is their mother tongue (first language).

Notes

See also
 List of countries and territories where Tamil is an official language
 Tamil population by nation
 Tamil population by cities

References

Tamil
India
Tamil people